Bà Chúa Kho (Lady of the Storehouse) is a goddess of Vietnamese folk religion, with her temple in Bắc Ninh. She is one of the new popular goddess like Bà Chúa Xứ, Lady of the Realm.

References

Vietnamese folk religion
Vietnamese goddesses
Vietnamese deities
Vietnamese gods